Jourdan Serderidis is a Belgian-Greek rally driver from Dorinne, Yvoir. He came tenth at the 2018 Rally Australia, then took a three-year break, returning for the 2021 Acropolis Rally. He finished 7th on the 2022 Safari Rally. He drives a Ford Puma Rally1. He won the WRC Trophy Champion title in 2017.

Rally results

WRC results

* Season still in progress.

References

External links

 Jourdan Serderidis's e-wrc profile

1964 births
Living people
Greek rally drivers
World Rally Championship drivers

M-Sport drivers